The following is a list of players, both past and current, who have appeared at least in one game for the Vancouver (1995–2001) or Memphis Grizzlies (2001–present) National Basketball Association (NBA) franchise.



Players
Note: Statistics are correct through the end of the  season.

A to B

|-
|align="left"| || align="center"|G || align="left"|LSU || align="center"|1 || align="center"| || 41 || 486 || 25 || 76 || 266 || 11.9 || 0.6 || 1.9 || 6.5 || align=center|
|-
|align="left"| || align="center"|F || align="left"|California || align="center"|5 || align="center"|– || 375 || 14,237 || 3,070 || 1,081 || 7,801 || bgcolor="#CFECEC"|38.0 || 8.2 || 2.9 || bgcolor="#CFECEC"|20.8 || align=center|
|-
|align="left"| || align="center"|G || align="left"|UCLA || align="center"|2 || align="center"|– || 32 || 263 || 30 || 19 || 101 || 8.2 || 0.9 || 0.6 || 3.2 || align=center|
|-
|align="left" bgcolor="#CCFFCC"|x || align="center"|C || align="left"|Pittsburgh || align="center"|1 || align="center"| || 76 || 1,999 || 760 || 256 || 528 || 26.3 || 10.0 || 3.4 || 6.9 || align=center|
|-
|align="left" bgcolor="#CCFFCC"|x || align="center"|F || align="left"|Loyola (Maryland) || align="center"|1 || align="center"| || 32 || 360 || 87 || 21 || 132 || 11.3 || 2.7 || 0.7 || 4.1 || align=center|
|-
|align="left"| || align="center"|G || align="left"|Duke || align="center"|2 || align="center"|– || 88 || 1,977 || 245 || 160 || 862 || 22.5 || 2.8 || 1.8 || 9.8 || align=center|
|-
|align="left"| || align="center"|G/F || align="left"|Oklahoma State || align="center"|7 || align="center"|– || 462 || 11,588 || 1,964 || 629 || 4,128 || 25.1 || 4.3 || 1.4 || 8.9 || align=center|
|-
|align="left"| || align="center"|F || align="left"|Southern Illinois || align="center"|1 || align="center"| || 54 || 1,104 || 303 || 33 || 339 || 20.4 || 5.6 || 0.6 || 6.3 || align=center|
|-
|align="left"| || align="center"|F/C || align="left"|Blinn || align="center"|1 || align="center"| || 20 || 366 || 89 || 9 || 92 || 18.3 || 4.5 || 0.5 || 4.6 || align=center|
|-
|align="left" bgcolor="#CCFFCC"|x || align="center"|F || align="left"|UCLA || align="center"|4 || align="center"|– || 248 || 5,982 || 1,300 || 723 || 2,111 || 24.1 || 5.2 || 2.9 || 8.5 || align=center|
|-
|align="left"| || align="center"|G/F || align="left"|Illinois || align="center"|1 || align="center"| || 15 || 219 || 33 || 14 || 60 || 14.6 || 2.2 || 0.9 || 4.0 || align=center|
|-
|align="left"| || align="center"|G || align="left"|UNLV || align="center"|2 || align="center"|– || 134 || 3,959 || 358 || 883 || 1,583 || 29.5 || 2.7 || 6.6 || 11.8 || align=center|
|-
|align="left"| || align="center"|F || align="left"|Illinois || align="center"|1 || align="center"| || 12 || 72 || 17 || 3 || 19 || 6.0 || 1.4 || 0.3 || 1.6 || align=center|
|-
|align="left"| || align="center"|G || align="left"|Arizona || align="center"|1 || align="center"| || 17 || 211 || 18 || 18 || 72 || 12.4 || 1.1 || 1.1 || 4.2 || align=center|
|-
|align="left"| || align="center"|F || align="left"|Kansas || align="center"|4 || align="center"|– || 247 || 4,500 || 967 || 144 || 1,656 || 18.2 || 3.9 || 0.6 || 6.7 || align=center|
|-
|align="left"| || align="center"|G || align="left"|South Florida || align="center"|2 || align="center"|– || 118 || 3,225 || 214 || 475 || 1,479 || 27.3 || 1.8 || 4.0 || 12.5 || align=center|
|-
|align="left"| || align="center"|C || align="left"|Arizona State || align="center"|2 || align="center"|– || 73 || 1,152 || 293 || 71 || 302 || 15.8 || 4.0 || 1.0 || 4.1 || align=center|
|-
|align="left"| || align="center"|F || align="left"|Seton Hall || align="center"|1 || align="center"| || 71 || 1,586 || 355 || 69 || 415 || 22.3 || 5.0 || 1.0 || 5.8 || align=center|
|-
|align="left"| || align="center"|G || align="left"|Vanderbilt || align="center"|1 || align="center"| || 33 || 405 || 46 || 61 || 106 || 12.3 || 1.4 || 1.8 || 3.2 || align=center|
|-
|align="left" bgcolor="#CCFFCC"|x || align="center"|G || align="left"|TCU || align="center"|2 || align="center"|– || 144 || 3,785 || 544 || 326 || 2,009 || 26.3 || 3.8 || 2.3 || 14.0 || align=center|
|-
|align="left"| || align="center"|F || align="left"|UCLA || align="center"|1 || align="center"| || 76 || 2,190 || 420 || 163 || 758 || 28.8 || 5.5 || 2.1 || 10.0 || align=center|
|-
|align="left"| || align="center"|F || align="left"|Arizona State || align="center"|1 || align="center"| || 75 || 1,248 || 257 || 52 || 481 || 16.6 || 3.4 || 0.7 || 6.4 || align=center|
|-
|align="left"| || align="center"|F || align="left"|Duke || align="center"|6 || align="center"|– || 419 || 13,339 || 2,000 || 716 || 4,275 || 31.8 || 4.8 || 1.7 || 10.2 || align=center|
|-
|align="left"| || align="center"|G || align="left"|Arizona || align="center"|2 || align="center"|– || 111 || 2,415 || 235 || 330 || 943 || 21.8 || 2.1 || 3.0 || 8.5 || align=center|
|-
|align="left"| || align="center"|C || align="left"|Oregon || align="center"|1 || align="center"| || 2 || 21 || 3 || 2 || 10 || 10.5 || 1.5 || 1.0 || 5.0 || align=center|
|-
|align="left"| || align="center"|G || align="left"|Boston College || align="center"|1 || align="center"| || 6 || 34 || 4 || 4 || 11 || 5.7 || 0.7 || 0.7 || 1.8 || align=center|
|-
|align="left"| || align="center"|C || align="left"|Creighton || align="center"|1 || align="center"| || 13 || 404 || 103 || 16 || 181 || 31.1 || 7.9 || 1.2 || 13.9 || align=center|
|-
|align="left"| || align="center"|G || align="left"|Arizona || align="center"|3 || align="center"|– || 214 || 8,103 || 746 || 1,675 || 3,153 || 37.9 || 3.5 || bgcolor="#CFECEC"|7.8 || 14.7 || align=center|
|-
|align="left"| || align="center"|G || align="left"|Texas || align="center"|1 || align="center"| || 14 || 442 || 44 || 56 || 225 || 31.6 || 3.1 || 4.0 || 16.1 || align=center|
|-
|align="left"| || align="center"|G/F || align="left"|Arkansas || align="center"|1 || align="center"| || 5 || 80 || 7 || 3 || 10 || 16.0 || 1.4 || 0.6 || 2.0 || align=center|
|-
|align="left" bgcolor="#CCFFCC"|x || align="center"|G/F || align="left"|Oregon || align="center"|5 || align="center"|– || 272 || 7,674 || 829 || 546 || 3,955 || 28.2 || 3.0 || 2.0 || 14.5 || align=center|
|-
|align="left"| || align="center"|G/F || align="left"|Providence || align="center"|2 || align="center"|– || 36 || 580 || 66 || 50 || 331 || 16.1 || 1.8 || 1.4 || 9.2 || align=center|
|-
|align="left"| || align="center"|F || align="left"|DePaul || align="center"|1 || align="center"| || 33 || 286 || 92 || 8 || 100 || 8.7 || 2.8 || 0.2 || 3.0 || align=center|
|-
|align="left"| || align="center"|F || align="left"|Glynn Academy (GA) || align="center"|1 || align="center"| || 15 || 204 || 57 || 17 || 52 || 13.6 || 3.8 || 1.1 || 3.5 || align=center|
|-
|align="left"| || align="center"|G || align="left"|Murray State || align="center"|1 || align="center"| || 2 || 10 || 2 || 2 || 2 || 5.0 || 1.0 || 1.0 || 1.0 || align=center|
|-
|align="left"| || align="center"|G || align="left"|Clemson || align="center"|1 || align="center"| || 63 || 878 || 130 || 57 || 155 || 13.9 || 2.1 || 0.9 || 2.5 || align=center|
|-
|align="left"| || align="center"|G/F || align="left"|Creighton || align="center"|1 || align="center"| || 63 || 1,769 || 272 || 71 || 591 || 28.1 || 4.3 || 1.1 || 9.4 || align=center|
|-
|align="left"| || align="center"|G || align="left"|Memphis || align="center"|2 || align="center"|– || 81 || 789 || 49 || 104 || 186 || 9.7 || 0.6 || 1.3 || 2.3 || align=center|
|}

C to D

|-
|align="left"| || align="center"|F || align="left"| Pinheiros || align="center"|2 || align="center"|– || 56 || 992 || 202 || 60 || 344 || 17.7 || 3.6 || 1.1 || 6.1 || align=center|
|-
|align="left"| || align="center"|G || align="left"|Florida || align="center"|2 || align="center"|– || 129 || 2,011 || 243 || 353 || 590 || 15.6 || 1.9 || 2.7 || 4.6 || align=center|
|-
|align="left"| || align="center"|F || align="left"|Purdue || align="center"|4 || align="center"|– || 159 || 2,588 || 435 || 200 || 897 || 16.3 || 2.7 || 1.3 || 5.6 || align=center|
|-
|align="left"| || align="center"|F || align="left"|Memphis || align="center"|1 || align="center"| || 2 || 5 || 1 || 0 || 2 || 2.5 || 0.5 || 0.0 || 1.0 || align=center|
|-
|align="left"| || align="center"|F/C || align="left"|Wichita State || align="center"|1 || align="center"| || 21 || 221 || 32 || 7 || 67 || 10.5 || 1.5 || 0.3 || 3.2 || align=center|
|-
|align="left"| || align="center"|F || align="left"|Missouri || align="center"|2 || align="center"|– || 78 || 834 || 158 || 35 || 219 || 10.7 || 2.0 || 0.4 || 2.8 || align=center|
|-
|align="left"| || align="center"|G || align="left"|West Virginia || align="center"|1 || align="center"| || 39 || 577 || 66 || 69 || 172 || 14.8 || 1.7 || 1.8 || 4.4 || align=center|
|-
|align="left"| || align="center"|G/F || align="left"|North Carolina || align="center"|3 || align="center"|– || 199 || 3,895 || 506 || 268 || 1,365 || 19.6 || 2.5 || 1.3 || 6.9 || align=center|
|-
|align="left"| || align="center"|F || align="left"| Maccabi Tel Aviv || align="center"|1 || align="center"| || 36 || 520 || 115 || 26 || 226 || 14.4 || 3.2 || 0.7 || 6.3 || align=center|
|-
|align="left"| || align="center"|G || align="left"|Kansas || align="center"|2 || align="center"| || 121 || 2,674 || 300 || 408 || 1,102 || 22.1 || 2.5 || 3.4 || 9.1 || align=center|
|-
|align="left"| || align="center"|F/C || align="left"|North Carolina || align="center"|3 || align="center"|– || 182 || 2,779 || 579 || 181 || 753 || 15.3 || 3.2 || 1.0 || 4.1 || align=center|
|-
|align="left" bgcolor="#CCFFCC"|x || align="center"|F || align="left"|Gonzaga|| align="center"|3 || align="center"|– || 181 || 3,961 || 1,015 || 262 || 1,976 || 21.9 || 5.6 || 1.4 || 10.9 || align=center|
|-
|align="left"| || align="center"|C || align="left"|Stanford || align="center"|1 || align="center"| || 31 || 488 || 89 || 6 || 80 || 15.7 || 2.9 || 0.2 || 2.6 || align=center|
|-
|align="left"| || align="center"|G || align="left"|Ohio State || align="center" bgcolor="#CFECEC"|12 || align="center"|– || bgcolor="#CFECEC"|788 || 25,700 || 2,327 || bgcolor="#CFECEC"|4,509 || bgcolor="#CFECEC"|11,733 || 32.6 || 3.0 || 5.7 || 14.9 || align=center|
|-
|align="left"| || align="center"|G || align="left"|Washington || align="center"|1 || align="center"| || 3 || 17 || 2 || 1 || 0 || 5.7 || 0.7 || 0.3 || 0.0 || align=center|
|-
|align="left"| || align="center"|G || align="left"|Providence || align="center"|1 || align="center"| || 5 || 6 || 0 || 0 || 4 || 1.2 || 0.0 || 0.0 || 0.8 || align=center|
|-
|align="left"| || align="center"|G || align="left"|Georgia Tech || align="center"|2 || align="center"|– || 35 || 552 || 95 || 38 || 225 || 15.8 || 2.7 || 1.1 || 6.4 || align=center|
|-
|align="left"| || align="center"|F || align="left"|Marquette || align="center"|1 || align="center"| || 45 || 1,322 || 277 || 125 || 447 || 29.4 || 6.2 || 2.8 || 9.9 || align=center|
|-
|align="left" bgcolor="#CCFFCC"|x || align="center"|G || align="left"|Texas Tech|| align="center"|1 || align="center"| || 37 || 338 || 48 || 33 || 130 || 9.1 || 1.3 || 0.9 || 3.5 || align=center|
|-
|align="left"| || align="center"|F || align="left"|Villanova || align="center"|1 || align="center"| || 64 || 1,124 || 246 || 37 || 333 || 17.6 || 3.8 || 0.6 || 5.2 || align=center|
|-
|align="left"| || align="center"|G || align="left"|Duke || align="center"|1 || align="center"| || 1 || 4 || 0 || 0 || 0 || 4.0 || 0.0 || 0.0 || 0.0 || align=center|
|-
|align="left"| || align="center"|G || align="left"|Bowling Green || align="center"|1 || align="center"| || 74 || 1,956 || 143 || 334 || 579 || 26.4 || 1.9 || 4.5 || 7.8 || align=center|
|-
|align="left"| || align="center"|G || align="left"|VCU || align="center"|1 || align="center"| || 67 || 1,183 || 100 || 46 || 551 || 17.7 || 1.5 || 0.7 || 8.2 || align=center|
|-
|align="left"| || align="center"|F/C || align="left"|Michigan State || align="center"|2 || align="center"|– || 98 || 1,181 || 310 || 42 || 418 || 12.1 || 3.2 || 0.4 || 4.3 || align=center|
|-
|align="left"| || align="center"|F || align="left"|North Carolina || align="center"|2 || align="center"|– || 99 || 1,500 || 420 || 35 || 542 || 15.2 || 4.2 || 0.4 || 5.5 || align=center|
|-
|align="left"| || align="center"|F || align="left"|Wyoming || align="center"|1 || align="center"| || 15 || 130 || 27 || 6 || 28 || 8.7 || 1.8 || 0.4 || 1.9 || align=center|
|-
|align="left"| || align="center"|F || align="left"|Gonzaga || align="center"|1 || align="center"| || 31 || 328 || 60 || 21 || 125 || 10.6 || 1.9 || 0.7 || 4.0 || align=center|
|-
|align="left"| || align="center"|G || align="left"|Seton Hall || align="center"|1 || align="center"| || 22 || 271 || 22 || 26 || 74 || 12.3 || 1.0 || 1.2 || 3.4 || align=center|
|-
|align="left"| || align="center"|G/F || align="left"|Arizona || align="center"|4 || align="center"|– || 162 || 5,932 || 526 || 458 || 2,710 || 36.6 || 3.2 || 2.8 || 16.7 || align=center|
|-
|align="left"| || align="center"|C || align="left"|Louisville || align="center"|2 || align="center"|– || 39 || 689 || 196 || 44 || 296 || 17.7 || 5.0 || 1.1 || 7.6 || align=center|
|-
|align="left"| || align="center"|G || align="left"|Missouri || align="center"|1 || align="center"| || 7 || 82 || 1 || 8 || 31 || 11.7 || 0.1 || 1.1 || 4.4 || align=center|
|-
|align="left"| || align="center"|G || align="left"|Oregon || align="center"|1 || align="center"| || 21 || 447 || 70 || 39 || 206 || 21.3 || 3.3 || 1.9 || 9.8 || align=center|
|-
|align="left"| || align="center"|G || align="left"|Florida State || align="center"|1 || align="center"| || 24 || 394 || 61 || 56 || 117 || 16.4 || 2.5 || 2.3 || 4.9 || align=center|
|}

E to G

|-
|align="left"| || align="center"|G/F || align="left"|East Carolina || align="center"|3 || align="center"|– || 224 || 6,180 || 752 || 527 || 2,393 || 27.6 || 3.4 || 2.4 || 10.7 || align=center|
|-
|align="left"| || align="center"|F || align="left"|Florida State || align="center"|1 || align="center"| || 31 || 519 || 87 || 39 || 93 || 16.7 || 2.8 || 1.3 || 3.0 || align=center|
|-
|align="left"| || align="center"|G || align="left"|DePaul || align="center"|1 || align="center"| || 46 || 634 || 82 || 52 || 160 || 13.8 || 1.8 || 1.1 || 3.5 || align=center|
|-
|align="left"| || align="center"|F/C || align="left"|Maryland || align="center"|1 || align="center"| || 39 || 351 || 92 || 8 || 125 || 9.0 || 2.4 || 0.2 || 3.2 || align=center|
|-
|align="left"| || align="center"|G || align="left"|North Carolina || align="center"|1 || align="center"| || 40 || 676 || 52 || 42 || 218 || 16.9 || 1.3 || 1.1 || 5.5 || align=center|
|-
|align="left"| || align="center"|F || align="left"|Texas Tech || align="center"|1 || align="center"| || 8 || 28 || 2 || 0 || 7 || 3.5 || 0.3 || 0.0 || 0.9 || align=center|
|-
|align="left"| || align="center"|F || align="left"|Long Beach State || align="center"|3 || align="center"|– || 119 || 2,594 || 423 || 115 || 755 || 21.8 || 3.6 || 1.0 || 6.3 || align=center|
|-
|align="left"| || align="center"|G/F || align="left"|Memphis || align="center"|1 || align="center"| || 52 || 1,607 || 265 || 269 || 1,010 || 30.9 || 5.1 || 5.2 || 19.4 || align=center|
|-
|align="left"| || align="center"|G || align="left"|UCLA || align="center"|1 || align="center"| || 12 || 291 || 25 || 37 || 110 || 24.3 || 2.1 || 3.1 || 9.2 || align=center|
|-
|align="left"| || align="center"|G || align="left"|Washington State || align="center"|1 || align="center"| || 6 || 75 || 5 || 4 || 11 || 12.5 || 0.8 || 0.7 || 1.8 || align=center|
|-
|align="left"| || align="center"|F || align="left"| Panathinaikos || align="center"|1 || align="center"| || 28 || 320 || 62 || 10 || 108 || 11.4 || 2.2 || 0.4 || 3.9 || align=center|
|-
|align="left"| || align="center"|C || align="left"|Colgate || align="center"|1 || align="center"| || 1 || 3 || 0 || 0 || 0 || 3.0 || 0.0 || 0.0 || 0.0 || align=center|
|-
|align="left"| || align="center"|G || align="left"|San Diego State || align="center"|1 || align="center"| || 21 || 161 || 23 || 6 || 39 || 7.7 || 1.1 || 0.3 || 1.9 || align=center|
|-
|align="left"| || align="center"|G || align="left"|Penn State || align="center"|1 || align="center"| || 5 || 62 || 8 || 16 || 8 || 12.4 || 1.6 || 3.2 || 1.6 || align=center|
|-
|align="left" bgcolor="#FFCC00"|+ || align="center"|C || align="left"| CB Girona || align="center"|11 || align="center"|– || 769 || bgcolor="#CFECEC"|25,917 || bgcolor="#CFECEC"|5,942 || 2,639 || 11,684 || 33.7 || 7.7 || 3.4 || 15.2 || align=center|
|-
|align="left" bgcolor="#FFCC00"|+ || align="center"|F/C || align="left"| FC Barcelona || align="center"|7 || align="center"|– || 476 || 16,904 || 4,096 || 1,473 || 8,966 || 35.5 || 8.6 || 3.1 || 18.8 || align=center|
|-
|align="left"| || align="center"|F/C || align="left"|Old Dominion || align="center"|1 || align="center"| || 25 || 570 || 114 || 14 || 229 || 22.8 || 4.6 || 0.6 || 9.2 || align=center|
|-
|align="left"| || align="center"|F || align="left"|UConn || align="center"|7 || align="center"|– || 479 || 17,338 || 2,758 || 954 || 8,562 || 36.2 || 5.8 || 2.0 || 17.9 || align=center|
|-
|align="left"| || align="center"|F || align="left"|Northwestern State || align="center"|1 || align="center"| || 2 || 5 || 1 || 0 || 2 || 2.5 || 0.5 || 0.0 || 1.0 || align=center|
|-
|align="left"| || align="center"|G || align="left"|Weber State || align="center"|1 || align="center"| || 23 || 384 || 28 || 49 || 116 || 16.7 || 1.2 || 2.1 || 5.0 || align=center|
|-
|align="left"| || align="center"|G/F || align="left"| CSKA Moscow || align="center"|1 || align="center"| || 49 || 1,187 || 108 || 70 || 548 || 24.2 || 2.2 || 1.4 || 11.2 || align=center|
|-
|align="left"| || align="center"|F || align="left"|Kansas || align="center"|1 || align="center"| || 51 || 1,329 || 295 || 63 || 616 || 26.1 || 5.8 || 1.2 || 12.1 || align=center|
|-
|align="left"| || align="center"|F || align="left"|Alabama || align="center"|5 || align="center"|– || 271 || 6,128 || 1,672 || 270 || 2,293 || 22.6 || 6.2 || 1.0 || 8.5 || align=center|
|-
|align="left"| || align="center"|F || align="left"|Georgetown || align="center"|2 || align="center"|– || 98 || 2,905 || 428 || 179 || 1,234 || 29.6 || 4.4 || 1.8 || 12.6 || align=center|
|-
|align="left"| || align="center"|G || align="left"| Fenerbahçe || align="center"|1 || align="center"| || 44 || 484 || 73 || 45 || 173 || 11.0 || 1.7 || 1.0 || 3.9 || align=center|
|}

H to J

|-
|align="left"| || align="center"|C || align="left"| Saba Battery Tehran || align="center"|5 || align="center"|– || 134 || 821 || 285 || 35 || 270 || 6.1 || 2.1 || 0.3 || 2.0 || align=center|
|-
|align="left"| || align="center"|G/F || align="left"|North Carolina || align="center"|1 || align="center"| || 18 || 375 || 46 || 9 || 124 || 20.8 || 2.6 || 0.5 || 6.9 || align=center|
|-
|align="left"| || align="center"|G || align="left"|Arkansas || align="center"|2 || align="center"|– || 4 || 39 || 2 || 5 || 20 || 9.8 || 0.5 || 1.3 || 5.0 || align=center|
|-
|align="left"| || align="center"|G || align="left"|Wingate || align="center"|1 || align="center"| || 29 || 543 || 68 || 89 || 152 || 18.7 || 2.3 || 3.1 || 5.2 || align=center|
|-
|align="left"| || align="center"|F/C || align="left"|Georgetown || align="center"|2 || align="center"|– || 126 || 3,944 || 852 || 133 || 1,556 || 31.3 || 6.8 || 1.1 || 12.3 || align=center|
|-
|align="left"| || align="center"|G || align="left"|Kentucky || align="center"|3 || align="center"|– || 129 || 2,805 || 267 || 375 || 960 || 21.7 || 2.1 || 2.9 || 7.4 || align=center|
|-
|align="left"| || align="center"|F/C || align="left"|Pfeiffer || align="center"|1 || align="center"| || 18 || 410 || 94 || 9 || 98 || 22.8 || 5.2 || 0.5 || 5.4 || align=center|
|-
|align="left"| || align="center"|F || align="left"|UCLA || align="center"|1 || align="center"| || 30 || 331 || 47 || 22 || 97 || 11.0 || 1.6 || 0.7 || 3.2 || align=center|
|-
|align="left"| || align="center"|F || align="left"|DePaul || align="center"|1 || align="center"| || 20 || 378 || 38 || 22 || 107 || 18.9 || 1.9 || 1.1 || 5.4 || align=center|
|-
|align="left"| || align="center"|G || align="left"|Kansas || align="center"|1 || align="center"| || 38 || 527 || 37 || 18 || 165 || 13.9 || 1.0 || 0.5 || 4.3 || align=center|
|-
|align="left"| || align="center"|F || align="left"|Houston || align="center"|1 || align="center"| || 4 || 42 || 8 || 3 || 6 || 10.5 || 2.0 || 0.8 || 1.5 || align=center|
|-
|align="left"| || align="center"|F || align="left"|Arizona || align="center"|1 || align="center"| || 48 || 901 || 144 || 94 || 274 || 18.8 || 3.0 || 2.0 || 5.7 || align=center|
|-
|align="left"| || align="center"|F || align="left"|Washington || align="center"|1 || align="center"| || 44 || 1,282 || 154 || 61 || 417 || 29.1 || 3.5 || 1.4 || 9.5 || align=center|
|-
|align="left"| || align="center"|C || align="left"|UCLA || align="center"|1 || align="center"| || 32 || 412 || 87 || 10 || 116 || 12.9 || 2.7 || 0.3 || 3.6 || align=center|
|-
|align="left"| || align="center"|G || align="left"|UT Martin || align="center"|2 || align="center"| || 12 || 81 || 10 || 6 || 45 || 6.8 || 0.8 || 0.5 || 3.8 || align=center|
|-
|align="left"| || align="center"|F || align="left"|Notre Dame || align="center"|3 || align="center"|– || 50 || 450 || 120 || 11 || 133 || 9.0 || 2.4 || 0.2 || 2.7 || align=center|
|-
|align="left"| || align="center"|C || align="left"|DePaul || align="center"|1 || align="center"| || 21 || 158 || 42 || 0 || 53 || 7.5 || 2.0 || 0.0 || 2.5 || align=center|
|-
|align="left"| || align="center"|F || align="left"|UTEP || align="center"|1 || align="center"| || 4 || 7 || 3 || 0 || 6 || 1.8 || 0.8 || 0.0 || 1.5 || align=center|
|-
|align="left"| || align="center"|G || align="left"|Duke || align="center"|1 || align="center"| || 27 || 458 || 30 || 97 || 122 || 17.0 || 1.1 || 3.6 || 4.5 || align=center|
|-
|align="left" bgcolor="#FFFF99"|^ || align="center"|G || align="left"|Georgetown || align="center"|1 || align="center"| || 3 || 67 || 4 || 11 || 37 || 22.3 || 1.3 || 3.7 || 12.3 || align=center|
|-
|align="left"| || align="center"|G || align="left"|Minnesota || align="center"|1 || align="center"| || 71 || 1,775 || 223 || 195 || 808 || 25.0 || 3.1 || 2.7 || 11.4 || align=center|
|-
|align="left" bgcolor="#CCFFCC"|x || align="center"|F/C || align="left"|Michigan State || align="center"|4 || align="center"|–  || 204 || 5,521 || 1,050 || 240 || 3,218 || 27.1 || 5.1 || 1.2 || 15.8 || align=center|
|-
|align="left"| || align="center"|G/F || align="left"|Kansas || align="center"|1 || align="center"| || 22 || 381 || 66 || 35 || 198 || 17.3 || 3.0 || 1.6 || 9.0 || align=center|
|-
|align="left"| || align="center"|G/F || align="left"|Stanford || align="center"|1 || align="center"| || 53 || 547 || 65 || 20 || 107 || 10.3 || 1.2 || 0.4 || 2.0 || align=center|
|-
|align="left"| || align="center"|G || align="left"| Virtus Bologna || align="center"|1 || align="center"| || 53 || 605 || 65 || 74 || 136 || 11.4 || 1.2 || 1.4 || 2.6 || align=center|
|-
|align="left"| || align="center"|G || align="left"|Tulsa || align="center"|1 || align="center"| || 3 || 9 || 2 || 1 || 2 || 3.0 || 0.7 || 0.3 || 0.7 || align=center|
|-
|align="left"| || align="center"|F || align="left"|Florida State || align="center"|1 || align="center"| || 59 || 753 || 181 || 17 || 260 || 12.8 || 3.1 || 0.3 || 4.4 || align=center|
|-
|align="left"| || align="center"|F || align="left"|North Carolina || align="center"|1 || align="center"| || 9 || 60 || 18 || 1 || 27 || 6.7 || 2.0 || 0.1 || 3.0 || align=center|
|-
|align="left"| || align="center"|G/F || align="left"|Dayton || align="center"|1 || align="center"| || 8 || 102 || 11 || 2 || 29 || 12.8 || 1.4 || 0.3 || 3.6 || align=center|
|-
|align="left"| || align="center"|F || align="left"|Wake Forest || align="center"|1 || align="center"| || 52 || 956 || 166 || 111 || 384 || 18.4 || 3.2 || 2.1 || 7.4 || align=center|
|-
|align="left"| || align="center"|F || align="left"|Oregon State || align="center"|1 || align="center"| || 4 || 75 || 11 || 7 || 22 || 18.8 || 2.8 || 1.8 || 5.5 || align=center|
|-
|align="left"| || align="center"|F || align="left"|Washington || align="center"|1 || align="center"| || 9 || 137 || 27 || 11 || 40 || 15.2 || 3.0 || 1.2 || 4.4 || align=center|
|-
|align="left"| || align="center"|G/F || align="left"|Duke || align="center"|4 || align="center"|– || 221 || 3,441 || 349 || 140 || 1,133 || 15.6 || 1.6 || 0.6 || 5.1 || align=center|
|-
|align="left"| || align="center"|G || align="left"|Houston || align="center"|1 || align="center"| || 71 || 1,415 || 124 || 224 || 461 || 19.9 || 1.7 || 3.2 || 6.5 || align=center|
|-
|align="left"| || align="center"|G/F || align="left"|Temple || align="center"|2 || align="center"|– || 104 || 2,998 || 340 || 210 || 1,046 || 28.8 || 3.3 || 2.0 || 10.1 || align=center|
|-
|align="left" bgcolor="#CCFFCC"|x || align="center"|G || align="left"|Duke || align="center"|3 || align="center"|– || 208 || 4,003 || 419 || 868 || 1,558 || 19.2 || 2.0 || 4.2 || 7.5 || align=center|
|}

K to M

|-
|align="left"| || align="center"|F || align="left"|Wake Forest || align="center"|1 || align="center"| || 80 || 1,930 || 285 || 104 || 634 || 24.1 || 3.6 || 1.3 || 7.9 || align=center|
|-
|align="left"| || align="center"|G || align="left"|South Carolina || align="center"|2 || align="center"|– || 59 || 1,063 || 109 || 43 || 409 || 18.0 || 1.8 || 0.7 || 6.9 || align=center|
|-
|align="left"| || align="center"|G || align="left"|Stanford || align="center"|2 || align="center"|– || 108 || 2,079 || 190 || 535 || 587 || 19.3 || 1.8 || 5.0 || 5.4 || align=center|
|-
|align="left" bgcolor="#CCFFCC"|x || align="center"|G || align="left"|Purdue Fort Wayne || align="center"|3 || align="center"|– || 134 || 2,048 || 504 || 178 || 587 || 15.3 || 3.8 || 1.3 || 4.4 || align=center|
|-
|align="left"| || align="center"|C || align="left"|Ohio State || align="center"|2 || align="center"|– || 161 || 2,697 || 844 || 76 || 933 || 16.8 || 5.2 || 0.5 || 5.8 || align=center|
|-
|align="left"| || align="center"|G || align="left"|Texas A&M || align="center"|1 || align="center"| || 11 || 94 || 11 || 14 || 12 || 8.5 || 1.0 || 1.3 || 1.1 || align=center|
|-
|align="left"| || align="center"|F/C || align="left"|Wyoming || align="center"|1 || align="center"| || 19 || 115 || 35 || 4 || 34 || 6.1 || 1.8 || 0.2 || 1.8 || align=center|
|-
|align="left"| || align="center"|G || align="left"|Western Kentucky || align="center"|3 || align="center"|– || 177 || 5,312 || 434 || 310 || 1,828 || 30.0 || 2.5 || 1.8 || 10.3 || align=center|
|-
|align="left"| || align="center"|F || align="left"|Wisconsin || align="center"|3 || align="center"|– || 131 || 1,562 || 389 || 69 || 622 || 11.9 || 3.0 || 0.5 || 4.7 || align=center|
|-
|align="left"| || align="center"|F || align="left"|Eastern Michigan || align="center"|3 || align="center"|– || 174 || 4,295 || 739 || 262 || 1,016 || 24.7 || 4.2 || 1.5 || 5.8 || align=center|
|-
|align="left"| || align="center"|G || align="left"|St. John's || align="center"|2 || align="center"|– || 112 || 1,999 || 290 || 106 || 729 || 17.8 || 2.6 || 0.9 || 6.5 || align=center|
|-
|align="left"| || align="center"|G || align="left"|Villanova || align="center"|3 || align="center"|– || 141 || 3,335 || 392 || 506 || 1,217 || 23.7 || 2.8 || 3.6 || 8.6 || align=center|
|-
|align="left"| || align="center"|G || align="left"|Michigan State || align="center"|1 || align="center"| || 1 || 6 || 0 || 0 || 0 || 6.0 || 0.0 || 0.0 || 0.0 || align=center|
|-
|align="left"| || align="center"|F || align="left"|North Carolina || align="center"|2 || align="center"|– || 123 || 2,552 || 623 || 198 || 958 || 20.7 || 5.1 || 1.6 || 7.8 || align=center|
|-
|align="left"| || align="center"|G/F || align="left"|Houston || align="center"|2 || align="center"|– || 76 || 1,991 || 186 || 124 || 858 || 26.2 || 2.4 || 1.6 || 11.3 || align=center|
|-
|align="left"| || align="center"|G || align="left"|Butler || align="center"|1 || align="center"| || 53 || 1,204 || 102 || 182 || 421 || 22.7 || 1.9 || 3.4 || 7.9 || align=center|
|-
|align="left"| || align="center"|C || align="left"|Washington || align="center"|2 || align="center"|– || 45 || 439 || 78 || 9 || 151 || 9.8 || 1.7 || 0.2 || 3.4 || align=center|
|-
|align="left"| || align="center"|G/F || align="left"|Purdue || align="center"|1 || align="center"| || 4 || 19 || 2 || 2 || 9 || 4.8 || 0.5 || 0.5 || 2.3 || align=center|
|-
|align="left"| || align="center"|G || align="left"|UCLA || align="center"|1 || align="center"| || 24 || 402 || 38 || 61 || 161 || 16.8 || 1.6 || 2.5 || 6.7 || align=center|
|-
|align="left"| || align="center"|F || align="left"|LSU || align="center"|3 || align="center"|– || 142 || 2,599 || 566 || 96 || 883 || 18.3 || 4.0 || 0.7 || 6.2 || align=center|
|-
|align="left"| || align="center"|F || align="left"|Maryland || align="center"|4 || align="center"|– || 229 || 4,107 || 1,023 || 79 || 1,513 || 17.9 || 4.5 || 0.3 || 6.6 || align=center|
|-
|align="left"| || align="center"|G || align="left"|Purdue || align="center"|1 || align="center"| || 6 || 16 || 2 || 1 || 6 || 2.7 || 0.3 || 0.2 || 1.0 || align=center|
|-
|align="left"| || align="center"|G || align="left"|Arkansas || align="center"|3 || align="center"|– || 168 || 3,913 || 251 || 701 || 793 || 23.3 || 1.5 || 4.2 || 4.7 || align=center|
|-
|align="left"| || align="center"|G || align="left"|USC || align="center"|4 || align="center"|– || 301 || 9,873 || 999 || 818 || 4,584 || 32.8 || 3.3 || 2.7 || 15.2 || align=center|
|-
|align="left"| || align="center"|G || align="left"|Detroit Mercy || align="center"|1 || align="center"| || 10 || 219 || 16 || 27 || 69 || 21.9 || 1.6 || 2.7 || 6.9 || align=center|
|-
|align="left"| || align="center"|F || align="left"|Butler || align="center"|1 || align="center"| || 18 || 158 || 19 || 4 || 39 || 8.8 || 1.1 || 0.2 || 2.2 || align=center|
|-
|align="left"| || align="center"|G || align="left"|Kansas || align="center"|1 || align="center"| || 56 || 1,091 || 139 || 51 || 422 || 19.5 || 2.5 || 0.9 || 7.5 || align=center|
|-
|align="left" bgcolor="#CCFFCC"|x || align="center"|G || align="left"|USC || align="center"|3 || align="center"|– || 185 || 3,869 || 709 || 501 || 1,718 || 20.9 || 3.8 || 2.7 || 9.3 || align=center|
|-
|align="left"| || align="center"|G || align="left"|Utah State || align="center"|1 || align="center"| || 6 || 58 || 7 || 4 || 25 || 9.7 || 1.2 || 0.7 || 9.7 || align=center|
|-
|align="left"| || align="center"|G/F || align="left"|Skyline HS (TX) || align="center"|1 || align="center"| || 13 || 294 || 27 || 14 || 121 || 22.6 || 2.1 || 1.1 || 9.3 || align=center|
|-
|align="left"| || align="center"|F || align="left"|East St. Louis HS (IL) || align="center"|1 || align="center"| || 34 || 298 || 57 || 17 || 120 || 8.8 || 1.7 || 0.5 || 3.5 || align=center|
|-
|align="left"| || align="center"|F/C || align="left"| Hemofarm || align="center"|2 || align="center"|– || 131 || 2,697 || 688 || 92 || 838 || 20.6 || 5.3 || 0.7 || 6.4 || align=center|
|-
|align="left"| || align="center"|G/F || align="left"|Florida || align="center"|7 || align="center"|– || 453 || 13,597 || 2,020 || 1,351 || 5,982 || 30.0 || 4.5 || 3.0 || 13.2 || align=center|
|-
|align="left"| || align="center"|C || align="left"|Pittsburgh || align="center"|2 || align="center"|– || 62 || 918 || 186 || 36 || 254 || 14.8 || 3.0 || 0.6 || 4.1 || align=center|
|-
|align="left" bgcolor="#FBCEB1"|* || align="center"|G || align="left"|Murray State || align="center"|3 || align="center"|–  || 187 || 6,016 || 836 || 1,337 || 3,961 || 32.2 || 4.5 || 7.1 || 21.2 || align=center|
|-
|align="left"| || align="center"|G || align="left"|Michigan || align="center"|1 || align="center"| || 5 || 66 || 8 || 8 || 15 || 13.2 || 1.6 || 1.6 || 3.0 || align=center|
|-
|align="left"| || align="center"|G || align="left"|Syracuse || align="center"|2 || align="center"|– || 111 || 1,787 || 180 || 179 || 738 || 16.1 || 1.6 || 1.6 || 6.6 || align=center|
|-
|align="left"| || align="center"|G || align="left"|Rhode Island || align="center"|1 || align="center"| || 14 || 244 || 31 || 22 || 80 || 17.4 || 2.2 || 1.6 || 5.7 || align=center|
|-
|align="left"| || align="center"|G || align="left"|Providence || align="center"|1 || align="center"| || 64 || 1,480 || 155 || 292 || 585 || 23.1 || 2.4 || 4.6 || 9.1 || align=center|
|}

N to P

|-
|align="left"| || align="center"|G || align="left"| FC Barcelona || align="center"|1 || align="center"| || 82 || 2,117 || 210 || 177 || 896 || 25.8 || 2.6 || 2.2 || 10.9 || align=center|
|-
|align="left"| || align="center"|F || align="left"|North Carolina || align="center"|1 || align="center"| || 4 || 27 || 5 || 1 || 5 || 6.8 || 1.3 || 0.3 || 1.3 || align=center|
|-
|align="left"| || align="center"|F || align="left"|Georgia Tech || align="center"|1 || align="center"| || 28 || 249 || 69 || 9 || 58 || 8.9 || 2.5 || 0.3 || 2.1 || align=center|
|-
|align="left"| || align="center"|C || align="left"|Florida || align="center"|1 || align="center"| || 42 || 693 || 238 || 89 || 298 || 16.5 || 5.7 || 2.1 || 7.1 || align=center|
|-
|align="left"| || align="center"|G || align="left"|West Florida || align="center"|1 || align="center"| || 8 || 89 || 12 || 23 || 12 || 11.1 || 1.5 || 2.9 || 1.5 || align=center|
|-
|align="left"| || align="center"|F || align="left"|Houston || align="center"|1 || align="center"| || 82 || 1,606 || 342 || 90 || 379 || 19.6 || 4.2 || 1.1 || 4.6 || align=center|
|-
|align="left"| || align="center"|F || align="left"|Texas || align="center"|1 || align="center"| || 1 || 6 || 1 || 0 || 4 || 6.0 || 1.0 || 0.0 || 4.0 || align=center|
|-
|align="left"| || align="center"|F || align="left"|Kentucky || align="center"|1 || align="center"| || 7 || 33 || 9 || 0 || 2 || 4.7 || 1.3 || 0.0 || 0.3 || align=center|
|-
|align="left"| || align="center"|G || align="left"|Colorado State || align="center"|1 || align="center"| || 53 || 394 || 51 || 48 || 108 || 7.4 || 1.0 || 0.9 || 2.0 || align=center|
|-
|align="left"| || align="center"|G || align="left"|Gonzaga || align="center"|1 || align="center"| || 44 || 424 || 37 || 55 || 126 || 9.6 || 0.8 || 1.3 || 2.9 || align=center|
|-
|align="left"| || align="center"|F/C || align="left"|Duke || align="center"|2 || align="center"|– || 104 || 1,926 || 426 || 71 || 434 || 18.5 || 4.1 || 0.7 || 4.2 || align=center|
|-
|align="left"| || align="center"|F || align="left"|Florida || align="center"|3 || align="center"|– || 95 || 1,862 || 244 || 167 || 681 || 19.6 || 2.6 || 1.8 || 7.2 || align=center|
|-
|align="left"| || align="center"|G || align="left"|Missouri || align="center"|2 || align="center"|– || 80 || 2,493 || 267 || 279 || 1,120 || 31.2 || 3.3 || 3.5 || 14.0 || align=center|
|-
|align="left"| || align="center"|G || align="left"|Memphis || align="center"|1 || align="center"| || 2 || 48 || 4 || 7 || 11 || 24.0 || 2.0 || 3.5 || 5.5 || align=center|
|-
|align="left"| || align="center"|G || align="left"|Auburn || align="center"|2 || align="center"|– || 82 || 2,225 || 210 || 135 || 810 || 27.1 || 2.6 || 1.6 || 9.9 || align=center|
|-
|align="left"| || align="center"|C || align="left"|Texas || align="center"|1 || align="center"| || 7 || 20 || 5 || 0 || 2 || 2.9 || 0.7 || 0.0 || 0.3 || align=center|
|-
|align="left"| || align="center"|G/F || align="left"|Washington || align="center"|4 || align="center"|– || 168 || 3,055 || 341 || 136 || 874 || 18.2 || 2.0 || 0.8 || 5.2 || align=center|
|-
|align="left" bgcolor="#CCFFCC"|x || align="center"|F || align="left"|Tennessee || align="center"|1 || align="center"| || 12 || 71 || 12 || 1 || 13 || 5.9 || 1.0 || 0.1 || 1.1 || align=center|
|-
|align="left"| || align="center"|F || align="left"|Missouri || align="center"|1 || align="center"| || 11 || 54 || 14 || 1 || 22 || 4.9 || 1.3 || 0.1 || 2.0 || align=center|
|-
|align="left"| || align="center"|G/F || align="left"|Xavier || align="center"|2 || align="center"|– || 132 || 3,833 || 622 || 210 || 1,531 || 29.0 || 4.7 || 1.6 || 11.6 || align=center|
|-
|align="left"| || align="center"|F || align="left"|California || align="center"|1 || align="center"| || 16 || 141 || 25 || 5 || 88 || 8.8 || 1.6 || 0.3 || 5.5 || align=center|
|-
|align="left"| || align="center"|G || align="left"|Oklahoma || align="center"|2 || align="center"|– || 47 || 454 || 41 || 74 || 154 || 9.7 || 0.9 || 1.6 || 3.3 || align=center|
|-
|align="left"| || align="center"|F || align="left"|Kentucky || align="center"|3 || align="center"|– || 139 || 3,750 || 472 || 241 || 969 || 27.0 || 3.4 || 1.7 || 7.0 || align=center|
|}

R to S

|-
|align="left"| || align="center"|F || align="left"|California || align="center"|2 || align="center"|– || 85 || 1,237 || 364 || 86 || 485 || 14.6 || 4.3 || 1.0 || 5.7 || align=center|
|-
|align="left" bgcolor="#FFCC00"|+ || align="center"|F/C || align="left"|Michigan State || align="center"|8 || align="center"|– || 551 || 17,928 || 5,612 || 1,085 || 9,261 || 32.5 || 10.2 || 2.0 || 16.8 || align=center|
|-
|align="left"| || align="center"|G || align="left"|Florida State || align="center"|1 || align="center"| || 5 || 118 || 5 || 18 || 29 || 23.6 || 1.0 || 3.6 || 5.8 || align=center|
|-
|align="left"| || align="center"|C || align="left"|Oklahoma State || align="center"|6 || align="center"|– || 395 || 12,071 || 2,745 || 623 || 4,945 || 30.6 || 6.9 || 1.6 || 12.5 || align=center|
|-
|align="left"| || align="center"|G/F || align="left"|USC || align="center"|1 || align="center"| || 10 || 123 || 13 || 10 || 34 || 12.3 || 1.3 || 1.0 || 3.4 || align=center|
|-
|align="left"| || align="center"|G/F || align="left"|Delta State || align="center"|1 || align="center"| || 3 || 15 || 1 || 1 || 0 || 5.0 || 0.3 || 0.3 || 0.0 || align=center|
|-
|align="left"| || align="center"|G || align="left"|Florida || align="center"|1 || align="center"| || 16 || 88 || 6 || 5 || 35 || 5.5 || 0.4 || 0.3 || 2.2 || align=center|
|-
|align="left"| || align="center"|F || align="left"|Mississippi State || align="center"|2 || align="center"|– || 87 || 1,150 || 310 || 35 || 334 || 13.2 || 3.6 || 0.4 || 3.8 || align=center|
|-
|align="left"| || align="center"|G || align="left"|Western Kentucky || align="center"|2 || align="center"|– || 57 || 824 || 84 || 75 || 242 || 14.5 || 1.5 || 1.3 || 4.2 || align=center|
|-
|align="left"| || align="center"|G/F || align="left"|Centenary || align="center"|1 || align="center"| || 6 || 41 || 12 || 1 || 17 || 6.8 || 2.0 || 0.2 || 2.8 || align=center|
|-
|align="left"| || align="center"|F || align="left"|Alabama || align="center"|1 || align="center"| || 82 || 1,848 || 386 || 46 || 543 || 22.5 || 4.7 || 0.6 || 6.6 || align=center|
|-
|align="left"| || align="center"|G || align="left"|SMU || align="center"|1 || align="center"| || 68 || 1,164 || 126 || 47 || 265 || 17.1 || 1.9 || 0.7 || 3.9 || align=center|
|-
|align="left"| || align="center"|F || align="left"|Texas Tech || align="center"|1 || align="center"| || 6 || 39 || 7 || 2 || 11 || 6.5 || 1.2 || 0.3 || 1.8 || align=center|
|-
|align="left"| || align="center"|G || align="left"|Arizona State || align="center"|1 || align="center"| || 80 || 1,894 || 192 || 123 || 819 || 23.7 || 2.4 || 1.5 || 10.2 || align=center|
|-
|align="left"| || align="center"|F || align="left"|Georgia Tech || align="center"|1 || align="center"| || 66 || 1,263 || 106 || 69 || 369 || 19.1 || 1.6 || 1.0 || 5.6 || align=center|
|-
|align="left"| || align="center"|G || align="left"|Kansas || align="center"|2 || align="center"|– || 38 || 296 || 20 || 34 || 83 || 7.8 || 0.5 || 0.9 || 2.2 || align=center|
|-
|align="left"| || align="center"|G/F || align="left"|Kansas || align="center"|3 || align="center"|– || 78 || 1,336 || 111 || 114 || 552 || 17.1 || 1.4 || 1.5 || 7.1 || align=center|
|-
|align="left"| || align="center"|G || align="left"|Arizona || align="center"|1 || align="center"| || 32 || 643 || 50 || 68 || 196 || 20.1 || 1.6 || 2.1 || 6.1 || align=center|
|-
|align="left"| || align="center"|F || align="left"|Baylor || align="center"|1 || align="center"| || 1 || 4 || 0 || 0 || 0 || 4.0 || 0.0 || 0.0 || 0.0 || align=center|
|-
|align="left"| || align="center"|G || align="left"|Wake Forest || align="center"|1 || align="center"| || 15 || 113 || 5 || 15 || 27 || 7.5 || 0.3 || 1.0 || 1.8 || align=center|
|-
|align="left"| || align="center"|F || align="left"|Providence || align="center"|2 || align="center"|– || 78 || 1,804 || 556 || 107 || 412 || 23.1 || 7.1 || 1.4 || 5.3 || align=center|
|-
|align="left"| || align="center"|G || align="left"|Louisville || align="center"|2 || align="center"|– || 21 || 102 || 12 || 17 || 48 || 4.9 || 0.6 || 0.8 || 2.3 || align=center|
|-
|align="left"| || align="center"|F || align="left"|Ball State || align="center"|1 || align="center"| || 20 || 178 || 41 || 7 || 44 || 8.9 || 2.1 || 0.4 || 2.2 || align=center|
|-
|align="left"| || align="center"|F || align="left"|Kansas State || align="center"|1 || align="center"| || 2 || 8 || 2 || 0 || 0 || 4.0 || 1.0 || 0.0 || 0.0 || align=center|
|-
|align="left"| || align="center"|G || align="left"|Clemson || align="center"|1 || align="center"| || 62 || 872 || 68 || 92 || 321 || 14.1 || 1.1 || 1.5 || 5.2 || align=center|
|-
|align="left"| || align="center"|F/C || align="left"|Florida || align="center"|2 || align="center"|– || 100 || 1,924 || 563 || 66 || 788 || 19.2 || 5.6 || 0.7 || 7.9 || align=center|
|-
|align="left"| || align="center"|G/F || align="left"|Memphis || align="center"|1 || align="center"| || 1 || 7 || 0 || 0 || 2 || 7.0 || 0.0 || 0.0 || 2.0 || align=center|
|-
|align="left"| || align="center"|F || align="left"|Little Rock || align="center"|1 || align="center"| || 13 || 181 || 36 || 11 || 41 || 13.9 || 2.8 || 0.8 || 3.2 || align=center|
|-
|align="left"| || align="center"|G/F || align="left"|Cincinnati || align="center"|1 || align="center"| || 26 || 692 || 115 || 73 || 369 || 26.6 || 4.4 || 2.8 || 14.2 || align=center|
|-
|align="left"| || align="center"|F || align="left"|USC || align="center"|1 || align="center"| || 4 || 61 || 26 || 2 || 20 || 15.3 || 6.5 || 0.5 || 5.0 || align=center|
|-
|align="left"| || align="center"|F/C || align="left"|Tennessee || align="center"|2 || align="center"|– || 21 || 130 || 36 || 4 || 57 || 6.2 || 1.7 || 0.2 || 2.7 || align=center|
|-
|align="left"| || align="center"|G || align="left"|Arizona || align="center"|3 || align="center"|– || 118 || 2,987 || 305 || 539 || 995 || 25.3 || 2.6 || 4.6 || 8.4 || align=center|
|-
|align="left"| || align="center"|G || align="left"|Nebraska || align="center"|1 || align="center"| || 22 || 409 || 76 || 66 || 140 || 18.6 || 3.5 || 3.0 || 6.4 || align=center|
|-
|align="left"| || align="center"|F || align="left"|LSU || align="center"|7 || align="center"|– || 441 || 8,980 || 2,128 || 243 || 3,829 || 20.4 || 4.8 || 0.6 || 8.7 || align=center|
|}

T to Z

|-
|align="left"| || align="center"|G || align="left"|Kentucky || align="center"|1 || align="center"| || 3 || 74 || 6 || 13 || 11 || 24.7 || 2.0 || 4.3 || 3.7 || align=center|
|-
|align="left"| || align="center"|G || align="left"|LSU || align="center"|1 || align="center"| || 49 || 1,530 || 152 || 69 || 463 || 31.2 || 3.1 || 1.4 || 9.4 || align=center|
|-
|align="left" bgcolor="#CCFFCC"|x || align="center"|G || align="left"|Stanford || align="center"|1 || align="center"| || 2 || 3 || 0 || 0 || 2 || 1.5 || 0.0 || 0.0 || 1.0 || align=center|
|-
|align="left"| || align="center"|C || align="left"|Michigan || align="center"|1 || align="center"| || 3 || 8 || 2 || 1 || 0 || 2.7 || 0.7 || 0.3 || 0.0 || align=center|
|-
|align="left"| || align="center"|C || align="left"|UConn || align="center"|2 || align="center"|– || 113 || 1,252 || 318 || 15 || 261 || 11.1 || 2.8 || 0.1 || 2.3 || align=center|
|-
|align="left"| || align="center"|F || align="left"|Minnesota || align="center"|1 || align="center"| || 3 || 25 || 0 || 1 || 4 || 8.3 || 0.0 || 0.3 || 1.3 || align=center|
|-
|align="left"| || align="center"|F || align="left"|LSU || align="center"|1 || align="center"| || 2 || 7 || 0 || 1 || 4 || 3.5 || 0.0 || 0.5 || 2.0 || align=center|
|-
|align="left"| || align="center"|F/C || align="left"|Providence || align="center"|1 || align="center"| || 47 || 1,574 || 371 || 161 || 528 || 33.5 || 7.9 || 3.4 || 11.2 || align=center|
|-
|align="left" bgcolor="#CCFFCC"|x || align="center"|C || align="left"|Gonzaga || align="center"|2 || align="center"|– || 54 || 643 || 84 || 30|| 175 || 11.9 || 1.6 || 0.6 || 3.2 || align=center|
|-
|align="left" bgcolor="#CCFFCC"|x || align="center"|F || align="left"|Michigan State || align="center"|2 || align="center"|– || 12 || 1,786 || 417 || 137 || 642 || 15.9 || 3.7 || 1.2 || 5.7 || align=center|
|-
|align="left"| || align="center"|G || align="left"|Iowa State || align="center"|1 || align="center"| || 38 || 589 || 66 || 108 || 133 || 15.5 || 1.7 || 2.8 || 3.5 || align=center|
|-
|align="left"| || align="center"|F || align="left"|Creighton || align="center"|1 || align="center"| || 13 || 236 || 33 || 10 || 62 || 18.2 || 2.5 || 0.8 || 4.8 || align=center|
|-
|align="left"| || align="center"|C || align="left"| Znicz Pruszków || align="center"|1 || align="center"| || 15 || 86 || 14 || 1 || 14 || 5.7 || 0.9 || 0.1 || 0.9 || align=center|
|-
|align="left"| || align="center"|C || align="left"| AEK Athens || align="center"|4 || align="center"|– || 145 || 1,801 || 460 || 43 || 559 || 12.4 || 3.2 || 0.3 || 3.9 || align=center|
|-
|align="left"| || align="center"|G || align="left"| Olimpia Milano || align="center"|3 || align="center"|– || 97 || 1,669 || 154 || 252 || 679 || 17.2 || 1.6 || 2.6 || 7.0 || align=center|
|-
|align="left"| || align="center"|F || align="left"|Iowa || align="center"|1 || align="center"| || 4 || 14 || 1 || 0 || 4 || 3.5 || 0.3 || 0.0 || 1.0 || align=center|
|-
|align="left"| || align="center"|C || align="left"| Lietuvos rytas || align="center"|3 || align="center"|– || 151 || 4,127 || 1,767 || 284 || 2,481 || 27.3 || bgcolor="#CFECEC"|11.7 || 1.9 || 16.4 || align=center|
|-
|align="left"| || align="center"|G || align="left"|Maryland || align="center"|1 || align="center"| || 70 || 860 || 73 || 151 || 249 || 12.3 || 1.0 || 2.2 || 3.6 || align=center|
|-
|align="left"| || align="center"|F || align="left"|Syracuse || align="center"|4 || align="center"|– || 307 || 6,659 || 1,326 || 224 || 3,126 || 21.7 || 4.3 || 0.7 || 10.2 || align=center|
|-
|align="left"| || align="center"|F || align="left"|UTEP || align="center"|1 || align="center"| || 18 || 254 || 41 || 14 || 40 || 14.1 || 2.3 || 0.8 || 2.2 || align=center|
|-
|align="left"| || align="center"|F || align="left"|George Washington || align="center"|2 || align="center"|– || 33 || 279 || 51 || 13 || 75 || 8.5 || 1.5 || 0.4 || 2.3 || align=center|
|-
|align="left"| || align="center"|G || align="left"|UCLA || align="center"|3 || align="center"|– || 240 || 4,843 || 506 || 986 || 1,508 || 20.2 || 2.1 || 4.1 || 6.3 || align=center|
|-
|align="left"| || align="center"|G || align="left"|VCU || align="center"|2 || align="center"| || 11 || 285 || 41 || 29 || 53 || 25.9 || 3.7 || 2.6 || 4.8 || align=center|
|-
|align="left"| || align="center"|G/F || align="left"|Ball State || align="center"|2 || align="center"|– || 128 || 2,957 || 428 || 184 || 1,449 || 23.1 || 3.3 || 1.4 || 11.3 || align=center|
|-
|align="left"| || align="center"|G/F || align="left"|Villanova || align="center"|3 || align="center"|– || 67 || 1,046 || 111 || 76 || 261 || 15.6 || 1.7 || 1.1 || 3.9 || align=center|
|-
|align="left"| || align="center"|G || align="left"|Louisville || align="center"|1 || align="center"| || 46 || 590 || 45 || 102 || 208 || 12.8 || 1.0 || 2.2 || 4.5 || align=center|
|-
|align="left"| || align="center"|G/F || align="left"|Chattanooga || align="center"|1 || align="center"| || 28 || 738 || 65 || 68 || 188 || 26.4 || 2.3 || 2.4 || 6.7 || align=center|
|-
|align="left"| || align="center"|F/C || align="left"|Xavier || align="center"|1 || align="center"| || 32 || 553 || 138 || 15 || 197 || 17.3 || 4.3 || 0.5 || 6.2 || align=center|
|-
|align="left"| || align="center"|G || align="left"|Memphis || align="center"|1 || align="center"| || 5 || 45 || 4 || 4 || 8 || 9.0 || 0.8 || 0.8 || 1.6 || align=center|
|-
|align="left"| || align="center"|G || align="left"|Florida || align="center"|5 || align="center"|– || 295 || 8,834 || 684 || 2,069 || 3,400 || 29.9 || 2.3 || 7.0 || 11.5 || align=center|
|-
|align="left"| || align="center"|G || align="left"|UConn || align="center"|1 || align="center"| || 62 || 872 || 93 || 161 || 269 || 14.1 || 1.5 || 2.6 || 4.3 || align=center|
|-
|align="left"| || align="center"|F || align="left"|Indiana || align="center"|1 || align="center"| || 24 || 418 || 45 || 19 || 127 || 17.4 || 1.9 || 0.8 || 5.3 || align=center|
|-
|align="left" bgcolor="#CCFFCC"|x || align="center"|F || align="left"|Stanford || align="center"|1 || align="center"| || 62 || 1,346 || 129 || 65 || 501 || 21.7 || 2.1 || 1.0 || 8.1 || align=center|
|-
|align="left"| || align="center"|F || align="left"|Duke || align="center"|1 || align="center"| || 26 || 507 || 118 || 50 || 178 || 19.5 || 4.5 || 1.9 || 6.8 || align=center|
|-
|align="left"| || align="center"|F/C || align="left"|North Carolina || align="center"|3 || align="center"|– || 67 || 1,025 || 214 || 34 || 407 || 15.3 || 3.2 || 0.5 || 6.1 || align=center|
|-
|align="left"| || align="center"|G || align="left"|Utah || align="center"|1 || align="center"| || 26 || 802 || 141 || 138 || 316 || 30.8 || 5.4 || 5.3 || 12.2 || align=center|
|-
|align="left"| || align="center"|F/C || align="left"|Memphis || align="center"|5 || align="center"|– || 336 || 8,883 || 2,386 || 330 || 3,148 || 26.4 || 7.1 || 1.0 || 9.4 || align=center|
|-
|align="left"| || align="center"|G || align="left"|Washington || align="center"|1 || align="center"| || 35 || 272 || 28 || 43 || 91 || 7.8 || 0.8 || 1.2 || 2.6 || align=center|
|-
|align="left"| || align="center"|F || align="left"|Pittsburgh || align="center"|3 || align="center"|– || 179 || 3,138 || 429 || 132 || 1,241 || 17.5 || 2.4 || 0.7 || 6.9 || align=center|
|-
|align="left"| || align="center"|F/C || align="left"|North Carolina || align="center"|1 || align="center"| || 4 || 82 || 18 || 3 || 46 || 20.5 || 4.5 || 0.8 || 11.5 || align=center|
|}

External links
 Memphis Grizzlies all-time roster

References

National Basketball Association all-time rosters

roster